is a passenger railway station located in the city of Kuroshio, Hata District, Kōchi Prefecture, Japan. It is operated by the Tosa Kuroshio Railway and has the station number "TK35".

Lines and services
Only local trains stop at the station.

Layout
The station is set on a hillside above the level of an adjacent secondary road and consists of a single narrow side platform serving a single track. The station is unmanned and there is no station building, only a shelter for waiting passengers. There is a small car park and bicycle shed at the base of the hill next to the secondary road. A wheelchair ramp leads up to the platform.

Adjacent stations

|-
!colspan=5|Tosa Kuroshio Railway

History
The station opened on 22 April 2003.

Passenger statistics
In fiscal 2011, the station was used by an average of 2 passengers daily.

Surrounding area
National Route 56
Hata Youth Centre (幡多青少年の家)
Utsu beach

See also
 List of Railway Stations in Japan

References

External links

Railway stations in Kōchi Prefecture
Railway stations in Japan opened in 2003
Kuroshio, Kōchi